Viktoria Gorbatova (19 June 2002) is a Russian artistic gymnast. She resides in Dzerzhinsk, Russia, and is coached by Irina Kolobova.

Career 
Gorbatova won the team junior bronze medal at the 2014 Gym Festival in Trnava. She will turn senior in 2018, consequently becoming age-eligible for a place on the Russian gymnastics team for the 2018 World Championships.

Competitive history

References
Russian Gymnastics Profile

2002 births
Living people
Russian female artistic gymnasts
People from Dzerzhinsk, Russia
Sportspeople from Nizhny Novgorod Oblast